Komarov is a rural locality (a khutor) in Tomosinovskoye Rural Settlement, Chernyshkovsky District, Volgograd Oblast, Russia. The population was 28 as of 2010.

Geography 
Komarov is located in the steppe, 81 km southeast of Chernyshkovsky (the district's administrative centre) by road. Tormosin is the nearest rural locality.

References 

Rural localities in Chernyshkovsky District